The Wollangambe River, an Australian perennial river that is part of the HawkesburyNepean catchment within the Sydney Basin, is located in the Greater Blue Mountains Area of New South Wales.

Course and features
The river flows generally east and then north northeast, joined by three minor tributaries, mainly through rugged country that comprises Wollemi and Blue Mountains national parks. The river reaches its confluence with the Colo River west of Parsons Forest, near Colo Heights. The river descends  over its  course.

Environmental damage
Centennial Coal has been dumping mine effluent into the Wollangambe River for approximately 30 years, effectively killing large sections of it. 

In 2015, Centennial Coal released large amounts of coal fines into the Wollangambe River and  World Heritage listed areas of the Blue Mountains National Park.

See also

 List of rivers of Australia
 List of rivers of New South Wales (L-Z)
 Rivers of New South Wales

References

External links
 
 

Rivers of New South Wales
Hawkesbury River
Central Tablelands